Patasola is an extinct genus of New World monkeys from the Middle Miocene (Laventan in the South American land mammal ages; 13.8 to 11.8 Ma). Its remains have been found at the Konzentrat-Lagerstätte of La Venta in the Honda Group of Colombia. The type species is Patasola magdalenae.

Etymology 
Patasola magdalenae is named after the mythological Patasola ("one foot"), a forest spirit of the Gran Tolima region of Colombia. The species epithet refers to the Magdalena River in which valley the fossils were found.

Description 
Fossils of Patasola, a small insectivorous/frugivorous primate, were discovered in both the La Victoria and Villavieja Formations above and below the "Monkey Beds" of the Honda Group, that has been dated to the Laventan, about 13.4 to 11.8 Ma.

The type mandible of Patasola magdalenae is a juvenile specimen.

The genus is included in the Callitrichidae, after an initial description as an intermediate between the Callitrichidae and Saimiri.

Habitat 

The Honda Group, and more precisely the "Monkey Beds", are the richest site for fossil primates in South America. It has been argued that the monkeys of the Honda Group were living in habitat that was in contact with the Amazon and Orinoco Basins, and that La Venta itself was probably seasonally dry forest. The authors of the publication about Patasola however suggests the presence of rain forest.

See also 

 List of primates of Colombia
 Lagonimico
 Mohanamico

References

Bibliography

Further reading 
 
 

†Patasola
Prehistoric monkeys
Miocene extinctions
Miocene primates of South America
Laventan
Neogene Colombia
Fossils of Colombia
Honda Group, Colombia
magdalenae
Fossil taxa described in 1997